The 2020–21 NBA G League season was the 20th season of the NBA G League, the official minor league basketball organization owned by the National Basketball Association (NBA). The season was indefinitely postponed following the previous season's cessation amid the COVID-19 pandemic. The league used the same type of isolation season as the 2020 NBA Bubble with all games at ESPN Wide World of Sports Complex in Bay Lake, Florida. Only 17 of the 28 teams from the previous season, plus the new NBA G League Ignite development team, chose to participate.

League changes
In December 2019, NBA commissioner Adam Silver announced that the Capitanes de Ciudad de México of the Liga Nacional de Baloncesto Profesional would be joining the G League in the 2020–21 season on a five-year agreement. The 2019–20 season was then curtailed by the restrictions of the COVID-19 pandemic and all remaining games after March 12, 2020, and the playoffs were cancelled.

On July 9, 2020, the Phoenix Suns announced they were relocating their G League franchise, the Northern Arizona Suns, from the Prescott Valley to the Phoenix area for the 2020–21 season and subsequently sold the franchise to the Detroit Pistons. The Pistons plan to move the team to Detroit in the 2021–22 season under the name Motor City Cruise. The New Orleans Pelicans launched a name-the-team contest for their upcoming team in Birmingham.

During the constantly changing restrictions amid the pandemic, no announcements for the 2020–21 season were made by the league or the NBA. The NBA season began in December 2020. It was rumored that all games for the G League season would take place in a bubble similar to the 2020 NBA Bubble in either Atlanta, Georgia, or outside Orlando, Florida, with several teams likely to opt out, but that the NBA G League Ignite prospects team would be joining. The bubble season was confirmed by the league on January 8, 2021, to start in February at ESPN Wide World of Sports Complex at Walt Disney World in Bay Lake, Florida. Eleven teams opted out of the season: the Capital City Go-Go, College Park Skyhawks, Grand Rapids Drive, Maine Red Claws, Northern Arizona Suns, Sioux Falls SkyForce, South Bay Lakers, Stockton Kings, Texas Legends, Windy City Bulls, and Wisconsin Herd. The Capitanes de Ciudad de México also announced they would postpone their first season in the league until 2021–22.

The schedule was announced on January 27 with the 18 teams each playing 15 regular season games between February 9 and March 6. There is no conference or divisional alignment in the bubble and the top eight teams play a single-elimination playoff from March 8 through the championship game on March 11.

Regular season

Playoffs
For the first time since the 2006–07 NBA Development League season, the playoffs were held entirely as a single-elimination bracket (the league held this type of format from 2003 to 2007, albeit with four teams for the first three seasons and six for the last season).

Awards

Player of the Week

Notable occurrences 

 On July 9, 2020, Tori Miller became the first female general manager (GM) in the NBA G League when she was promoted to the position by the College Park Skyhawks.
On January 15, 2021, Amber Nichols became the second female general manager in the NBA G League when she was promoted to the position by the Capital City Go-Go.

References

External links
Official website

 
Nba G League season